Leonid Mykhailovych Klimov (born March 31, 1953) is a Ukrainian parliamentarian, banker, and politician. He is a member of the Party of Regions in Verkhovna Rada (from November, 2007) and a member of the Committee on National Security and Defense (from December, 2007). He is also a member of the Party of Regions Council and chairman in the Odesa Oblast department of the Party of Regions.

Biography
He was born on March 31, 1953 in Makiivka, Donetsk Oblast. He has a wife, Tatiana Yuriivna (b. 1962), who is a housewife, and three children: daughters Daria (1983) and Anastasia (1997) and son, Alex (1994).

He graduated from the Odesa Institute of People's Economy in 1979. He was an economist of Product Management and Organization of Food Products.

Timeline of career

Commercial
1970–71 – fireman for the municipal fire department of the city of Makiivka.
1971–73 – service in the army.
1973–76 – driver for the Odesa branch of the RAdio-Telegraph Agency for the Cabmin of UkrSSR (RATAU), the Odesa plant producing tactical construction vehicles, and the Regional Tuberculosis Clinic.
1974–79 – student of the Odesa Institute of People's Economy.
1976 – manager of Store #11 of the Odesa Regional office of the Ukrainian Republican Union Sportproducts.
1976–79 – chief of the Instruction Department of the Central District Committee of Lenin's Komsomol of the Ukrainian Peasant's Youth (LKSMU) in the city of Odesa.
1979–80 – instructor of the organizational department for the executive committee of the Odesa City Council of People's Deputies.
1980–82 – acting for the deputy-chief of theVRP, a chief of the trade-producing sector for the Odesa Railroad.
1982–89 – deputy-director and director of the Seaside Produce trade for the Odesa Trade Administration.
1989 – deputy-chief of the Trade Administration for the Odesa Oblast Executive Committee.
1989–90 – chief of service and the general director of the Railroad Association, and chief of the worker's supply department for the Odesa Railroad.
1990–91 – director of the small enterprise "Progress" (Prohres), the city of Odesa.
1991–95 – president of the collective enterprise "Trade house-Seaside Ltd." (Torhovy dim-Prymorya LTD), the city of Odesa.
1995–2001 – president of the CJSC Financial Group "Seaside" (Prymorya), the city of Odesa.
2001–02 – president of the CJSC Football Club "Chornomorets".

Political
April, 2002 – April, 2006 – People's Deputy of Ukraine (IV Convocation) from electoral district #143 of Odesa Oblast nominated by the political bloc For United Ukraine!, and received 30.35% of votes while competing against 10 other candidates.
At the time of the elections  – president of the Odesa Bank Union.
May–June, 2002 – member of the Party of Regions while also in the political bloc For United Ukraine!.
June, 2002 – September, 2005 – authorized representative of bloc Regions of Ukraine.
From September, 2005 – authorized representative of the bloc for the political party Regions of Ukraine.
June, 2002 – May, 2006 – member of the Banking and Finance Committee.
April, 2006 – November, 2007 – People's Deputy of Ukraine (V Convocation) from the Party of Regions, listed as #39.
From July, 2006 – member of the Banking and Finance Committee.
From May, 2006 – member of the political bloc Party of Regions.
From November, 2007 – People's Deputy of Ukraine (VI Convocation) from the Party of Regions, listed as #38.

In the 2012 parliamentary election he was (re)-elected into parliament for Party of Regions after winning (with 48.46%) in single-member districts number 137 (first-past-the-post wins a parliament seat) located in Odesa Oblast. In 2014, he joined the parliamentary faction Economic Development.

In the 2014 parliamentary election Klimov was re-elected into parliament again as an independent candidate again in single-member districts number 137; this time with 30.09% of the votes.

In the 2019 Ukrainian parliamentary election Klimov lost reelection as an independent candidate in single-seat constituency 137 (Podilsk).

Awards
Klimov was awarded the Order of Merit III degree (April, 2003).

See also
Imexbank

References

External links
 Verkhovna Rada official web-site
 "Who is who in Ukraine", publication of "К.І.С"
 Leonid Klimov as president of IMEXBANK, brief profile 

1953 births
Living people
People from Makiivka
Party of Regions politicians
Fourth convocation members of the Verkhovna Rada
Fifth convocation members of the Verkhovna Rada
Sixth convocation members of the Verkhovna Rada
Ukrainian football chairmen and investors
FC Chornomorets Odesa
Odesa National Economics University alumni